The Hillside Club is a neighborhood social club established in 1898  by residents of Berkeley, California's newly formed Northside neighborhood to protect the hills from unsightly grading and unsuitable buildings. It took its cue from the Arts and Crafts movement. 

Prominent early club members included architects Bernard Maybeck and John Galen Howard, author Charles Keeler, and the journalist Frank Morton Todd.
 
Maybeck designed the original 1906 clubhouse, which was destroyed in the 1923 Berkeley Fire. John White, Maybeck's brother-in-law, designed the current clubhouse in 1924.

Among the club's first projects was the construction of Hillside Elementary School for the Berkeley Public Schools.

References

External links 

Buildings and structures in Berkeley, California
Clubhouses in California
1906 establishments in California
Buildings and structures completed in 1924
Bernard Maybeck buildings
American Craftsman architecture in California
Culture of Berkeley, California